Panamarenko is the third album by Swedish pop band Pineforest Crunch, released in 2002.  The album was recorded following the band's US tour of Autumn 1998.

Track listing

Personnel
Åsa Eklund: Lead vocals, acoustic guitars, flute and theremin
Mats Lundgren: bass and basspedals, keyboards
Olle Söderström: Acoustic and electric guitars, backing vocals
Jonas Petterson: Acoustic and electric guitars, backing vocals, clarinet
Mattias Olsson: drums and percussion

References

2002 albums